Astraeus is a titan in Greek mythology.

Astraeus may also refer to:

Astraeus Airlines
Astraeus (beetle), a genus of insects in the family Buprestidae
Astraeus (fungus), a genus of fungi in the family Diplocystaceae
Astraeus (mythology), other figures in Greek mythology